Scenic Roots is an album by the progressive bluegrass Maryland band The Seldom Scene.

Track listing
 If You Ever Change Your Mind (Carl Jackson, Stuart) 02:07
 Lots in a Memory (Wes Golding) 03:41
 The Wrath of God (Delmore, Delmore) 02:34
 Before I Met You (Lewis, Rader, Seitz) 03:13
 Red Georgia Clay (Coleman, Pyrtle) 02:25
 I've Cried My Last Tear over You (Delmore, Jackson) 02:57
 Not in My Arms (Coleman, Pyrtle) 02:24
 Highway of Heartache (Carl Jackson, Rushing) 03:17
 Long Black Veil (Dill, Wilkin) 04:12
 Last Call to Glory (Duffey) 02:38
 Distant Train (Coleman, Pyrtle) 02:24
 How Mountain Girls Can Love (Rakes) 02:06

Personnel
 Lou Reid - vocals, guitar, mandolin
 John Duffey - mandolin, vocals
 Ben Eldridge - banjo, guitar, vocals
 Mike Auldridge - Dobro, guitar, vocals
 T. Michael Coleman - bass, vocals

References

External links
Official site

1990 albums
The Seldom Scene albums
Sugar Hill Records albums